State Route 243 (SR-243) is a  long state highway in the U.S. state of Utah, connecting U.S. Highway 89 to the Beaver Mountain Ski Resort. The highway is located in the Bear River Mountains, a sub-range of the Wasatch Range.

Route description
The route then turns to the southwest and continues climbing, ending at the beginning of the parking area for the ski resort.

History
SR-243 was defined in 1953 by the Utah State Legislature as a connection from US-89 to the Beaver Mountain ski resort. The route has not changed since.

Major intersections

References

243
 243